Cape Romanzof LRRS Airport  is a military airstrip located six nautical miles (6.9 miles, 11 km) southeast of Cape Romanzof, in the Kusilvak Census Area of the U.S. state of Alaska. It is not open for public use.

Overview
Cape Romanzof Airport is a United States Air Force military airstrip. Its mission is to provide access to the Cape Romanzof Long Range Radar Station for servicing and other requirements.

The airstrip was constructed in 1951 during the construction of the Cape Romanzof Air Force Station. During the station's operational use as a manned radar station, it provided transportation for station personnel and for supplies and equipment to be airlifted to the station. With the manned radar station's closure in 1983, the airstrip now provides access to the unattended site for maintenance personnel and other requirements.

It is not staffed by any support personnel, and is not open to the public. During the winter months, it may be inaccessible due to the extreme weather conditions at the location.

Facilities 
Cape Romanzof LRRS Airport has one runway designated 2/20 with a gravel surface measuring 3,925 by 161 feet (1,196 x 49 m).

Statistics

References

External links 
 Aerial photo of runway
 

Airports in the Kusilvak Census Area, Alaska
Military installations in Alaska